Jim Bird is an American politician who served as a Republican member of the Utah House of Representatives for District 42 from 2007 to 2015.

Background
Bird was born January 16 in Salt Lake City, Utah. He works in the financial and insurance industry. Bird lives in West Jordan, Utah with his wife Tamra and three children. During the 2014 General Session Bird served on the House Business and Labor Committee as well as the House Economic Development and Workforce Services Committee.

Elections
2012 Bird was challenged but selected by the Republican convention for the November 6, 2012 General election with 10,600 votes.
2006 Bird challenged District 42 incumbent Republican Representative Peggy Wallace in the 2006 Republican Primary, winning by 25 votes with 1,004 votes (50.6%) and won the November 7, 2006 General election with 4,458 votes (58.7%) against Democratic nominee Norman Springer.
2008 Bird had three challengers including former Representative Wallace; the Republican convention selected Bird for the November 4, 2008 General election, which Bird won with 9,686 votes (66.1%) against Democratic nominee Nathan Gedge.
2010 Bird was challenged but selected by the Republican convention and was unopposed for the November 2, 2010 General election, winning with 8,035 votes.

References

External links
Official page at the Utah State Legislature
Campaign site

Jim Bird at Ballotpedia
Jim Bird at OpenSecrets

Year of birth missing (living people)
Living people
Republican Party members of the Utah House of Representatives
Politicians from Salt Lake City
People from West Jordan, Utah
21st-century American politicians